An Airport station or Airport Station may refer to a train station named as such or similarly. For other train stations located at an airport and named otherwise, see list of airport stations.

Airport station may refer to:

 Aeroport (Moscow Metro), a rapid transit station serving Khodynka Aerodrome in Moscow, Russia
 Airport (OC Transpo), a bus stop serving Ottawa Macdonald–Cartier International Airport in Ottawa, Ontario, Canada
 Airport station (GCRTA), a rapid transit station serving Cleveland Hopkins International Airport in Cleveland, Ohio, United States
 Airport station (Gwangju), a station serving Gwangju Airport in South Korea
 Airport station (MTR), a rapid transit station serving Hong Kong International Airport in Hong Kong, China
 Airport station (MARTA), a rapid transit station serving Hartsfield–Jackson Atlanta International Airport in Atlanta, Georgia, United States
 Airport station (MBTA), a rapid transit station serving Logan International Airport in Boston, Massachusetts, United States
 Airport station (Shenzhen Metro), a rapid transit station serving Terminal 3 of Shenzhen Bao'an International Airport in Shenzhen, China
 Airport station (TransLink), a former bus rapid transit station serving Vancouver International Airport in Richmond, British Columbia, Canada
 Airport station (UTA), a light rail station serving Salt Lake City International Airport in Salt Lake City, Utah, United States
 Airport metro station (Nagpur), a rapid transit station serving Dr. Babasaheb Ambedkar International Airport in Nagpur, India
 Airport Metro station (Tyne and Wear), a rapid transit station serving Newcastle International Airport in Newcastle upon Tyne, England, United Kingdom
 Airport Central railway station, a commuter rail station serving Perth Airport in Perth, Western Australia, Australia